The men's basketball tournament at the 1951 Pan American Games was held in the Luna Park in Buenos Aires, from February 28 to March 8, 1951.

Participating nations

Matches

Final ranking

Awards

Bibliography 
  .

References 

1951
Basketball
Pan American Games
Pan American Games
1951 Pan American Games